Franco Micalizzi (born 21 December 1939 in Rome) is an Italian composer and conductor, best known for his scores in Poliziotteschi films.

His first success was for the musical score of the Spaghetti Western They Call Me Trinity, in 1970. He had previously collaborated on composing with Roberto Pregadio the famous whistled western score for the 1969 film The Forgotten Pistolero (original: Il Pistolero dell'Ave Maria). His main theme for the 1976 poliziottesco film A Special Cop in Action was used in the soundtrack of Quentin Tarantino's Death Proof.

His other scores include The Last Snows of Spring, Beyond the Door and The Last Hunter. He often worked with Umberto Lenzi, scoring his movies Syndicate Sadists, Rome Armed to the Teeth, Violent Naples, The Cynic, the Rat and the Fist, Brothers Till We Die, The Greatest Battle, From Corleone to Brooklyn, Black Demons and Mean Tricks.

In 1984 he founded the group "The Micalizzi Family" with his sons Cristiano and Alessandro.

His piece "The Puzzle" appears in the soundtrack of Curb Your Enthusiasm and a slow tempo excerpt of it, rearranged for clarinet and bassoon, is often used in the series as the "stare" theme.

Selected filmography

References

External links 
 
 Franco Micalizzi at Discogs
 The Micalizzi family at Discogs

1939 births
Italian film score composers
Italian male film score composers
Living people
Spaghetti Western composers
Musicians from Rome